The Arfak astrapia (Astrapia nigra) is a species of astrapia, a group of birds found in the Paradiseidae family of the birds-of-paradise.

In the wild, the bird has hybridised with the black sicklebill creating offspring that were once considered a distinct species, Elliot's sicklebill "Epimachus ellioti". While some ornithologists still believe that this bird is a distinct species, possibly critically endangered or even extinct, many now think it was a hybrid between the two species.

Etymology 
This scientific name, Astrapia nigra, consists of the words "astrapaios" meaning flashing or lightning, and "nigra" meaning black. It was actually the first species of astrapia to be discovered, so the generic name was first assigned to this bird.

Conservation status
Protected by its geographical isolation and undisturbed forests home, the Arfak astrapia is evaluated as Least Concern on the IUCN Red List of Threatened Species. It is listed on Appendix II of CITES.

Description

The male has a black head with a bluish-purple sheen, or iridescence, an elongated jet-black nape crests extending up along the sides of the up to the eyes on each side, a shiny, metallic greenish-yellow cape from the mantle up to the nape, very black, dense and elongated upper breast feathers, and an almost exaggeratedly long tail almost two times the length of its body. The female is less appealing, being dark brown over most of its body and a blackish head, and sporting much shorter tail feathers. The female is also exceptionally shorter than the male.

Levaillant of France described this bird as L’Incomparable or Incomparable bird-of-paradise.

Ecology 
The habits of the Arfak astrapia are very little known. Foraging habits observed include the birds probing fruits, mostly pandanus fruits, off of moss and epiphytes in the montane canopy. Arthropods also recorded in the diet. Breeding habits mostly unknown; female definitely builds the nests and tend the chicks, as with most other birds-of-paradise, though the exact rearing period is unknown. All that is known about the courtship display is that the males display on a branch upside-down with their nape crests spread out, dense breast feathers flared up, and tail standing vertically upwards above the branch. No other information.

Distribution
Astrapia nigra is endemic to the Arfak Mountains in Vogelkop Peninsula, West Papua.

References

External links
 BirdLife Species Factsheet 

Astrapia
Birds of the Doberai Peninsula
Birds described in 1788
Taxa named by Johann Friedrich Gmelin